Vadim Viktorovich Zakharchenko (19 February 1929 —  2 January 2007) was a Soviet and Russian actor. He appeared in more than one hundred films from 1954 to 2002. Honored Artist of the Russian Federation (1993).

Selected filmography

References

External links 
 

1929 births
2007 deaths
Russian male film actors
Soviet male film actors
Actors from Novosibirsk
Honored Artists of the Russian Federation
Deaths from cerebrovascular disease
Gerasimov Institute of Cinematography alumni